Antonio Puche Vicente (born 2 August 1972), sometimes known as Puche II, is a Spanish former footballer who played as a forward, and a current manager.

Club career
Born in Yecla, Region of Murcia, Puche began his senior career with Elche CF, being almost exclusively associated with the reserves during his spell. He made his first-team debut at only 16, playing eight minutes in a 1–1 La Liga away draw against CA Osasuna; legendary László Kubala handed him his first opportunity with the professionals.

In the summer of 1993, after a spell with Valencia CF's reserves, Puche joined Palamós CF of Segunda División. He had a breakthrough year in his second season, scoring 21 goals to lead all players but being relegated due to the Catalan club's financial problems; on 9 April 1995, he netted six past CD Leganés – also eventually relegated – in a 7–1 home rout.

Puche continued competing in the second level in the following campaigns, with Villarreal CF, CD Toledo and Real Jaén. He retired in June 2004 at nearly 32 years of age, after several years in the lower leagues.

From 2005 to 2007, Puche worked as director of football at Cádiz CF. The following year he had his first senior experience in head coaching, with Tercera División's Xerez CD B, as well as also sharing directorial duties in the first team with former club player Antonio Poyatos.

In 2008–09, Puche was appointed assistant coach of Juan Carlos Mandiá at second-tier side Hércules CF. In the following years, the pair continued to work together.

Puche signed with Kuwaiti Premier League's Qadsia SC in 2014. He was dismissed on 23 March of the following year, as the team went on to finish in fourth place.

International career
Puche posted good scoring numbers with the Spain under-16 team. In an international tournament held in Genoa, he was named as best player.

Puche also played at under-20 level, being selected for the squad that appeared at the 1989 FIFA World Youth Championship held in Saudi Arabia.

Personal life
Puche's older, brother, José (1968), was also a footballer. A midfielder, he coincided with his sibling at Elche and Palamós, and the pair was known as Puche I and Puche II.

Honours

Individual
Pichichi Trophy (Segunda División): 1994–95

Manager
Al Qadsia
AFC Cup: 2014
Kuwait Super Cup: 2014

References

External links

1972 births
Living people
People from Yecla
Spanish footballers
Footballers from the Region of Murcia
Association football forwards
La Liga players
Segunda División players
Segunda División B players
Tercera División players
Yeclano CF players
Elche CF Ilicitano footballers
Elche CF players
Valencia CF Mestalla footballers
Palamós CF footballers
Villarreal CF players
CD Toledo players
Real Jaén footballers
Granada CF footballers
Novelda CF players
CD Linares players
Spain youth international footballers
Spanish football managers
Kuwait Premier League managers
Qadsia SC managers
Cypriot First Division managers
Anorthosis Famagusta F.C. managers
AFC Cup winning managers
Spanish expatriate football managers
Expatriate football managers in Kuwait
Expatriate football managers in Cyprus
Spanish expatriate sportspeople in Kuwait
Spanish expatriate sportspeople in Cyprus
Spanish expatriate sportspeople in France
Spanish expatriate sportspeople in Greece